Pontypool Changes Everything is the second novel in the Pontypool Trilogy,  by Tony Burgess, first published in 1995.

It was adapted into the 2008 film Pontypool with a screenplay by Burgess and was nominated for a Genie Award for the adaptation.

Overview

A new kind of virus that spreads through the use of language appears in the small Ontario town of Pontypool.  Victims lose the ability to make sense of language, driving them into bouts of madness and animalistic rage. In this novel, an outbreak of a strange plague, AMPS (Acquired Metastructural Pediculosis), causes people across Ontario to slip into aphasia and then into a cannibalistic zombie rage. AMPS is transferred through language and the only way to stop its spread is to outlaw communication. This metaphysical, deconstructionist virus requires a multi-disciplinary approach and doctors, semioticians, linguists, anthropologists, and even art critics present theories as to its source and treatment.

References

External links

1995 Canadian novels
Canadian novels adapted into films
English-language novels
Canadian thriller novels